Ludwig Alexander Friedrich August Philipp Freiherr von Falkenhausen (13 September 1844 – 4 May 1936) was a German officer most notable for his activities during World War I.

Before World War I
Falkenhausen was born in Guben. His parents were the Prussian Lieutenant-General D. Alexander von Falkenhausen (1821–1889) and his wife Catherine née Rouanet (1825–1907). Falkenhausen first attended a private school in Berlin and then, from May 1856, was a Cadet in Potsdam at the age of 11. In 1859, he moved to the main military academy in Berlin. In May 1862, he was attached to the 1st Foot Guards. Later, he was regimental adjutant of the combined Guards Reserve Infantry Regiment. At this position, Falkenhausen participated in both Second Schleswig War and 1866 campaign with the main army. Between October 1868 and May 1869, he served with the Guards Field Artillery as regimental adjutant.

In the Franco-Prussian War (1870–71), he participated in the battles of Gravelotte-St.Privat, Beaumont & Sedan and at the Siege of Paris. At the end of 1870, he was released from the position as regimental adjutant, and, from July 1871, he served as adjutant of the 28th Division in Karlsruhe.

In subsequent years, he was transferred several times: from the 40th Fusiliers to the Army General Staff, then to the General Staff of the 16th Division in Trier and the General Staff of the VIII Army Corps (Koblenz). In 1885, he was transferred as commander of the First Battalion (Cologne) in the 65th Infantry.

In March 1887, Falkenhausen was Chief of Staff of the Guards Corps (Berlin). In June 1890, he commanded the Queen Augusta Garde-Grenadier Regiment Nr 4 (Koblenz). Two years later, he led the 29th Infantry Brigade (Cologne) and 1893 was chief quartermaster of the Chief of General Staff of the Army. Between 1893 and 1895, he was also a member of the Study Commission of the Military Academy.

After working at the War Department, in January 1895 he became director of the General War Department in the Ministry of War. In February 1895, he was appointed representative in the Bundesrat. In January 1897, he became commander of the 2nd Guards Infantry Division (Berlin), and then, in 1899, he became the commanding general of the XIII (Royal Württemberg) Corps. In March 1902, he retired but kept busy with military science studies.

World War I

Upon mobilization in August 1914, Falkenhausen became commanding general of the Ersatz Corps of the 6th Army. As commander of Armee-Abteilung Falkenhausen, he commanded the German troops during the battles for the 1914/15 Delmer back and in the trench warfare in Lorraine (1915-1916).

He was highly successful during the first half of World War I and was awarded the Pour le Mérite on 23 August 1915, with oak leaves following on 15 April 1916.

After having commanded the coastal defenses near Hamburg (April–September 1916), on 28 September 1916 Falkenhausen was given command of the 6th Army at the Battle of Arras in April 1917. He failed to deploy correctly the newly developed defence in depth to counter new British and Dominion tactics and was removed from field command by General Erich Ludendorff.

Thereafter, he succeeded Moritz von Bissing and served as governor-general of the General Governorate of Belgium during the German occupation, from May 1917 until November 1918. In early 1918, The Times published an article – entitled Falkenhausen's reign of terror – describing 170 military executions of Belgian civilians that had taken place since he had been appointed governor.

Death
He died in Görlitz, Nazi Germany.

Family
During the Second World War, his nephew Alexander von Falkenhausen served as military governor of Belgium (22 May 1940 - 15 July 1944).

Awards and decorations
German honours
  Knight of the Order of the Black Eagle, 27 January 1917 (Prussia)
  Pour le Mérite (military), 23 August 1915; with Oak Leaves, 25 April 1916 (Prussia)
  Iron Cross, 2nd Class (1870); 1st Class (1914) (Prussia)
  Knight of the Order of the Red Eagle, 2nd Class with Oak Leaves (Prussia)
  Knight of the Order of the Prussian Crown, 2nd Class (Prussia)
  Knight of Justice of the Johanniter Order (Prussia)
  Knight of the Order of the Zähringer Lion, 1st Class with Swords, 1878; Commander 1st Class with Oak Leaves, 1893 (Baden)
  Knight of the Military Merit Order, 2nd Class (Bavaria)
  Knight of the Military Order of St. Henry, 15 September 1915 (Saxony)

Foreign honours
  Commander of the Imperial Order of Leopold, 1889 (Austria-Hungary)
  Commander of the Order of Saints Maurice and Lazarus (Italy)
  Order of the Rising Sun, 3rd Class (Japan)
  Knight of the Order of St. Anna, 2nd Class in Diamonds (Russia)
  Commander of the Order of the Sword, 2nd Class, 31 August 1888 (Sweden-Norway)

Notes

References

External links 
 Biography at the Lexikon der Deutschen Generale 
 

1844 births
1936 deaths
Ludwig
People from Guben
People from the Province of Brandenburg
Colonel generals of Prussia
Barons of Germany
Prussian military personnel of the Second Schleswig War
Prussian people of the Austro-Prussian War
German military personnel of the Franco-Prussian War
German Army generals of World War I
Burials at the Invalids' Cemetery
19th-century Prussian military personnel
Recipients of the Iron Cross (1914), 1st class
Recipients of the Iron Cross (1870), 2nd class
Recipients of the Pour le Mérite (military class)
Recipients of the Military Merit Order (Bavaria)
Commanders of the Order of Saints Maurice and Lazarus
Recipients of the Order of the Rising Sun, 3rd class
Recipients of the Order of St. Anna, 2nd class
Commanders of the Order of the Sword
German occupation of Belgium during World War I
Military personnel from Brandenburg